Actias isis is a moth of the family Saturniidae first described by Léon Sonthonnax in 1899.

Range
It is found only on the Indonesian island of Sulawesi.

Life cycle

Egg
Eggs are brown/grey, with a fine mottled pattern, ovate, approximately 2-3 millimetres long. The larvae emerge about 10–14 days after being deposited by the female (at typical indoor room temperature).

Larva
Larvae have five instars (molts/stages). The first instar is orange/brown, with a black band around the middle segments. The width of the dark band is variable. The larva has a dark brown head capsule. The larva changes to green at the start of the second instar, developing red/orange tubercles toward the end of the second instar. By the fourth instar, the tubercles become black and spiny. Later instars also develop white dot patterning. The larva can reach a maximum length of approximately 9-10 centimetres, and mass of 15 grams.

Pupa
Pupae are approximately 3–4 cm long, and rounded. Female pupae reach 7-10 grams, while male pupae reach 4-7 grams. Pupae are wrapped in a cocoon constructed as a thin single layer of yellow silk. The cocoon is easily permeable by the elements, and has a vent opening at the head end. Pupal development can be slowed at temperatures of about 15 °C - but this is not true diapause; The pupae will continue to develop at a decreased rate. If kept at 20 °C the moths emerge in around four weeks. Some pupae have black colouration, while others are brown. In those that have black colouration, it is not possible to see the wing patterns developing prior to emergence.

Adult
The adults usually only live 7–10 days. The adults do not eat.

Adult Actias isis exhibit sexual dimorphism.

Males have variable patterning of dark brown and yellow, with a black and brown crescent moon marking on the forewing and a brown eyespot on the hindwing. The hindwing has long dark-coloured tails extending as much as 20 cm, tipped in yellow.

Females are considerably heavier than the males, have a yellow base colour to the wings, and stronger thicker tails. Forewings are more rounded compared to the male's more falcate wings. The female will lay 150-250 eggs. Eggs will be deposited without the food plant being present.

Host plants
Food plants used in captivity include Eucalyptus gunnii, Liquidambar (sweetgum), Rhus (sumac), Prunus lusitanica (Portugal laurel), Arbutus unedo (strawberry tree) and Betula (birch). Crataegus (hawthorn), various types of rose, salix and Quercus ilex (holm oak) can be used, but with poor results.

Subspecies
Actias isis isis
Actias isis pelengensis U. Paukstadt & L.H. Paukstadt, 2014 (central Sulawesi)

References

 , 1994: Notes on the systematics of the maenas-group of the genus Actias Leach 1815 (Lepidoptera: Saturniidae). Nachrichten des Entomologischen Vereins Apollo. N.F. 15 (3): 327–338.
  & , 2014: Ein neuer wilder Seidenspinner vom Banggai-Archipel, Indonesien: Actias isis pelengensis subsp. nov. (Lepidoptera: Saturniidae). Beiträge zur Kenntnis der wilden Seidenspinner (Wilhelmshaven). 12 (2): 66–82.

Isis
Moths described in 1899
Moths of Indonesia